The  Mürzsteg Alps or Mürztal Alps are a mountain range in the Eastern Alps (Northern Limestone Alps), which lie in the Austrian state of Styria, with a small part of the range in Lower Austria. The highest peak is the Hohe Veitsch in the centre of the group, while largest massif is the  Schneealpe in the northwest, near the Rax.

The following ranges border on the Mürzsteg Alps: to the north the Türnitz Alps, to the northeast the Gutenstein Alps, to the east the Rax-Schneeberg Group, to the southeast the Prealps east of the Mur (specifically the Fischbach Alps) and to the west the Hochschwab Mountains.

Geology 
The range is part of the Styrian-Lower Austrian Limestone Alps and is separated from its neighbouring groups by the Mürz valley (part of the tectonically active Mur-Mürz Furrow), the upper reaches of the Mürz (main settlement: Mürzsteg) and the road over the Styrian Seeberg Pass. It is described by geologists as a ridge-and-basin facies.

The majority of its rocks date to the Triassic period and include Wetterstein Dolomite,  Hallstatt Limestone and Mürztal strata (dark, hornstein-dominated limestones and marls with foraminifers, brachiopods and other  fossils). 
The south of the range belong to the greywacke zone (rocks from the New Palaeozoic and the Lower Triassic).

Mountain huts  
 Graf-Meran House (ÖTK, on the highlands of the Hohe Veitsch)
 Schneealpen House (ÖAV, on the Schauerkogel/Schneealpe)
 Hinteralm House (ÖAV, north of the Schneealpe)                             
 Kutatsch Hut (open shelter belonging to the ÖAV on the Schneealpe)
 Lurgbauer Hut (private, on the upper slopes of the Schneealpe)
 Michlbauer Hut (private, on the upper slopes Schneealpe)
 Tonion Hut (Friends of Nature, on the Tonion)
 Kaarl Hut (private, west of Mürzzuschlag)

 
Mountain ranges of the Alps
Northern Limestone Alps
Greywacke zone
Mountain ranges of Styria
Mountain ranges of Lower Austria